The Sir George Hope Islands are a group of islands lying southwest of the Cobourg Peninsula in the Northern Territory of Australia.

Name
The name was given to the islands by the navigator and explorer Phillip Parker King who sailed into the area on 28 April 1818. King named them in honour of the then Vice admiral Sir George Hope.

Number and Location
The Sir George Hope Islands are five in number, the largerst being Greenhill Island, The others are Wangoindjung, Warldagawaji, Morse and Wunmiyi,  strung out on an east west axis for a distance of approximately 14 miles.

Protected area status
The Sir George Hope Islands are located within the Garig Gunak Barlu Marine Park.

Notes

Citations

Sources

Cobourg Peninsula
Islands of the Northern Territory